The Regional Council was an electoral college created in 1986 and became one of the functional constituencies between 1991 and 2000 for the Legislative Council of Hong Kong, until the Urban Council and the Regional Council themselves were abolished in 1999 and the constituencies replaced by District Council and Catering in the 2000 LegCo election. The constituency was composed of  members of the Regional Council.

Legislative Council members

Election results

1990s

1980s

References

Regional Council of Hong Kong
Constituencies of Hong Kong
Constituencies of Hong Kong Legislative Council
1986 establishments in Hong Kong
Constituencies established in 1986